Anthony J. Bates (born 29 April 1967) is a British born business leader. Bates is the former CEO of Growth at Social Capital. Previously, he held a number of technology based business roles including the former president of GoPro, and the former  executive vice president of Microsoft responsible for business development, strategy and evangelism and former CEO of Skype.

Bates, a university dropout, began his career in network operations and internet infrastructure. In the past, he has served on the boards of YouTube, TokBox, BubbleMotion, LoveFilm, SiriusXM, GoPro. , he serves on the boards of eBay and VMware. He first applied his experience to large-scale consumer products and services following Cisco's acquisition of the Scientific Atlanta set-top box business, and subsequently as Chief Executive Officer of Skype Technologies. He published a number of IETF RFCs  and holds a number of patents. On 6 May 2019 Bates was appointed to CEO of Genesys.

Early life and career

Bates was born in 1967 in West London. He was raised in Teddington by his hairdresser mother and stepfather who worked as a builder. He dropped out of his mechanical engineering program at South Bank Polytechnic.

Bates’ first job was at the University of London as a network operator in the computer center where he worked from 1986 to 1992. During his time at the university, his commute was one hour by train each way. He capitalized on this commute time by teaching himself the C programming language and by learning UNIX through DEC manuals. Bates was fortunate to be involved in the early days of the Internet running the Arpanet gateways between the U.S. and the U.K. Bates helped transition the U.K. academic network JANET from the academic Coloured Book protocols to TCP/IP, helping to create the JANET IP Service (JIPS).

He left the University of London Computer Centre in 1992 to work in Amsterdam on a Réseaux Associés pour la Recherche Européenne (RARE)-funded project as part of the RIPE NCC, an organization responsible for establishing the Europe IP registry and a number of operational standards for European networking. In 1994, he moved to Virginia, which at the time was considered the nexus of the Internet. He worked on the strategy and operation for the Internet MCI IP backbone.

Cisco 
Bates joined Cisco in 1996. He was employed at Cisco for more than 14 years and rose to senior vice president and general manager, heading up the enterprise, commercial and small business divisions.

Although his primary function at Cisco remained dedicated to infrastructure, other opportunities arose that sparked his interest. Projects such as Cisco's integration with Scientific Atlanta gave him a glimpse of the user side of the Internet.

Skype

In a 2011 interview with Voice on the Web, Bates admitted that one of his personal goals was to become the CEO of a company before age 45. According to the story, he wrote three names on a piece of paper and Skype was one of them. Bates said that once he joined as CEO, a key engineer in Estonia asked him how long he had been using Skype. He said in 2004, and when they ran the details of his Skype ID to verify, the engineer admitted that Bates started using Skype before he had.

Bates was hired as CEO of Skype in October 2010. When Bates joined Skype, only 6.5 percent of its users paid to make calls from their computers to landline or mobile devices. He was looking for ways to monetize Skype and envisioned extending Skype beyond recreational and video calling. "The world previously looked very much like there was a business world and a consumer world," Bates said in 2010. "They’re blurring very quickly."

In 2010, Bates made plans to offer paid premium phone and video services such as group videoconferencing, call waiting and answering services.

Microsoft
By the time Microsoft bought Skype, Bates had grown the monthly Skype user base to 170 million connected users per month. When Skype was officially acquired by Microsoft for $8.5 billion in May 2011, Bates announced that he wanted to eventually reach 1 billion connected users on Skype.

As the president of the Skype Division, Bates focussed on extending Skype reach across key Microsoft products like Internet Explorer (August 2011), Bing (Skype Bing Reward and Bing Bar in February 2012), Windows 8 (October 2012), Windows Phone (November 2012), Outlook (January 2013), and most recently upgrading Windows Live Messenger with Skype. Continuing Bates’ mission to blur the lines between consumer and business communication which he branded "B2X" at the Lync 2013 Conference, he announced that Lync, Microsoft's business communication solution, would be connected to Skype, and announced that Skype/Lync connectivity was expected by the end of June 2013.  Microsoft also announced plans for video calling in Outlook.com and announced a preview version in April 2013. Another anticipated Skype/Microsoft collaboration is with Xbox, which Bates called a "gateway into the living room" in an interview with USA Today in 2012. Skype currently reports 300 million connected users.

In September 2011, Bates announced an initiative called, Skype in the Classroom, with the goal of connecting 1 million teachers. In autumn 2012, Skype in the Workspace, an offshoot of Skype's small business and Skype for business initiative, launched with slightly less fanfare but still reflects Bates’ goals to expand Skype beyond just a consumer product.

Rumors circulated that Bates was in the running to be the next CEO at Microsoft when Steve Ballmer announced his plans to the position in 2013.  Bates was widely reported to be one of two internal candidates considered by the board for the role. In 2012, tech reporter Kara Swisher asked Bates directly if he would be the next CEO of Microsoft. He dodged the question.  From July 2013 to March 2014, Bates was appointed EVP Business Development, Strategy and Evangelism, taking the only customer/partner and technology facing role which spans all of Microsoft's portfolio of products and businesses.

According to reports, he is rumoured to have left Microsoft following the decision by the company's Board to appoint Satya Nadella as successor to Steve Ballmer.

GoPro
On 4 June 2014 GoPro announced the appointment of Tony Bates as President reporting directly to CEO Nick Woodman.
In November 2016, GoPro announced that President Tony Bates would be stepping down at the end of 2016.

Genesys
On 6 May 2019, Genesys announced the appointment of Tony Bates as CEO. He joined the $1.5Bn corporation during a period of rapid growth, with more than 5,000 employees globally.

Empathy in Action 
Bates published the book 'Empathy in Action: How to Deliver Great Customer Experiences at Scale' with his co-author Dr Natalie Petouhoff. Published by IdeaPress first as an eBook in December 2021, with the hardback edition published March 2022; this book examines how technology can become a force multiplier to deliver more empathy and integrate deeper, more personalized human connections into everyday business interactions at scale. The book was reviewed in Forbes by Adrian Swinscoe in the article 'How to Put Empathy into Action in Your Customer Experience'.

Philanthropy
Bates served on the board on the Silicon Valley-based nonprofit Tipping Point Community from June 2012 to July 2020. He and his wife are also on the board of trustees for the United States Olympic Committee.

Business positions

References

Living people
British business executives
Skype people
Microsoft people
Alumni of the University of London
Businesspeople in software
1967 births